Breg pri Konjicah is a settlement in the Municipality of Slovenske Konjice in eastern Slovenia. It lies on the right bank of the Dravinja River just east of Slovenske Konjice itself. The area is part of the traditional region of Styria. The municipality is now included in the Savinja Statistical Region.

Name
The name of the settlement was changed from Breg to Breg pri Konjicah in 1953.

References

External links
Breg pri Konjicah at Geopedia

Populated places in the Municipality of Slovenske Konjice